The 3 arrondissements of the Indre-et-Loire department are:
 Arrondissement of Chinon, (subprefecture: Chinon) with 106 communes.  The population of the arrondissement was 103,824 in 2016.  
 Arrondissement of Loches, (subprefecture: Loches) with 112 communes.  The population of the arrondissement was 118,282 in 2016.
 Arrondissement of Tours, (prefecture of the Indre-et-Loire department: Tours) with 54 communes.  The population of the arrondissement was 384,117 in 2016.

History

In 1800 the arrondissements of Tours, Chinon and Loches were established. The arrondissement of Loches was disbanded in 1926, and restored in 1943. 

The borders of the arrondissements of Indre-et-Loire were modified in January 2017:
 12 communes from the arrondissement of Chinon to the arrondissement of Tours
 34 communes from the arrondissement of Tours to the arrondissement of Chinon
 46 communes from the arrondissement of Tours to the arrondissement of Loches

References

Indre-et-Loire